Matt Carmichael is a Scottish jazz saxophonist known for his albums Where Will The River Flow and Marram.

Early life and education 
Born in the Scottish Highlands, Carmichael began playing saxophone at the age of 11. Carmichael played in the East Dunbartonshire School's Jazz Orchestra and Tommy Smith Youth Jazz Orchestra before enrolling at the Royal Conservatoire of Scotland.

Career 
Carmichael won the Peter Whittingham Jazz Award in 2019 and was a finalist in the 2020 BBC Young Jazz Musician competition. His style has been described as a combination of lyrical jazz and folk jazz. Carmichael is signed to Edition Records. He released his first album, Where Will The River Flow, in 2021. His second, Marram, was released in 2022.

References 

Living people
Scottish saxophonists
People from Lenzie
People from East Dunbartonshire
Musicians from East Dunbartonshire
Scottish jazz musicians
Scottish jazz saxophonists
Alumni of the Royal Conservatoire of Scotland
British jazz saxophonists
Jazz tenor saxophonists
British saxophonists
Year of birth missing (living people)